Norway competed at the 1960 Summer Olympics in Rome, Italy. 40 competitors, 39 men and 1 woman, took part in 39 events in 11 sports.

Athletics

Men's 100 metres
Carl Fredrik Bunæs
 Heat — 10.80 s (→ advanced to the quarter final)
 Quarter final — 10.69 s (→ did not advance)

Men's 200 metres
Carl Fredrik Bunæs
 Heat — 21.46 s (→ advanced to the quarter final)
 Quarter final — 21.50 s (→ did not advance)

Men's 1500 metres
Arne Hamarsland
 Heat — 3:44.63 min (→ advanced to the final)
 Final — 3:45.0 min (→ 9th place)
 
Men's marathon
Tor Torgersen — 2:27:30 hrs (→ 26th place)

Men's 110 metres hurdles
Jan Gulbrandsen
 Heat — 52.39 min (→ advanced to the semi final)
 Semi final — 52.56 min (→ did not advance)

Men's Long Jump
Roar Berthelsen
 Qualification — 7.09 m (→ did not advance)
 
Men's Javelin Throw
 Willy Rasmussen
 Round 1 — 77.95 metres (→ advanced to the final)
 Final — 78.36 metres (→ 5th place)
 Terje Pedersen
 Round 1 — 74.67 metres (→ advanced to the final)
 Final — DNS (→ no ranking)
 Egil Danielsen
 Round 1 — 72.93 metres (→ did not advance)

Women's Javelin Throw
 Unn Thorvaldsen
 Round 1 — 41.99 metres (→ did not advance)
 
Men's Discus Throw
 Stein Haugen
 Round 1 — 52.75 metres (→ advanced to the final)
 Final — 53.36 metres (→ 11th place)

Men's Hammer Throw
 Sverre Strandli
 Round 1 — 61.41 metres (→ advanced to the final)
 Final — 63.05 metres (→ 11th place)

Boxing

Canoeing

Cycling

One male cyclist represented Norway in 1960.

Individual road race
 Per Digerud

Fencing

One fencer represented Norway in 1960.

Men's foil
 Leif Klette

Men's épée
 Leif Klette

Gymnastics

Rowing

Norway had two male rowers participate in one out of seven rowing events in 1960.

 Men's double sculls
 Harald Kråkenes
 Sverre Kråkenes

Sailing

Shooting

Six shooters represented Norway in 1960.

25 m pistol
 Nicolaus Zwetnow

50 m pistol
 Kurt Johannessen

50 m rifle, three positions
 Erling Kongshaug
 Magne Landrø

50 m rifle, prone
 Erling Kongshaug
 Tor Richter

Trap
 Hans Aasnæs

Weightlifting

Wrestling

References

External links
Official Olympic Reports
International Olympic Committee results database

Nations at the 1960 Summer Olympics
1960
1960 in Norwegian sport